Kaye Ballard (November 20, 1925 – January 21, 2019) was an American actress, comedian, and singer.

Early life
Ballard was born Catherine Gloria Balotta in Cleveland, Ohio, one of four children born to Italian immigrant parents, Lena (née Nacarato) and Vincenzo (later Vincent James) Balotta. Her parents immigrated  to the United States from Calabria, a region of southern Italy.

Career
Ballard established herself as a musical comedian in the 1940s, joining the Spike Jones touring revue of entertainers. Capable of playing broad physical comedy as well as stand-up dialogue routines, she became familiar in television and stage productions. Ballard made her television debut on Henry Morgan's Great Talent Hunt, a short-lived program hosted by Henry Morgan  which first aired January 26, 1951. In 1954, she was the first person to record the song "Fly Me to the Moon".

In 1957, she and Alice Ghostley played the two wicked stepsisters in the live telecast of Rodgers and Hammerstein's Cinderella, starring Julie Andrews in the title role. During the 1961–1963 television seasons, Ballard was a regular on The Perry Como Show, as part of the Kraft Music Hall Players, along with Don Adams, Paul Lynde and Sandy Stewart. In 1962, she released the LP Peanuts, on which she played Lucy van Pelt from the comic strip namesake of the album (with Arthur Siegel playing Charlie Brown), and dramatizing a series of vignettes drawn from the strip's archive. In 1964, she had a guest role on The Patty Duke Show, playing a teacher for would-be models. From 1967 to 1969, she co-starred as Kaye Buell, a woman whose son marries her next door neighbor's daughter, in the sitcom The Mothers-in-Law, with Eve Arden playing her neighbour. From 1970 to 1972, she appeared as a regular on The Doris Day Show, playing restaurant owner Angie Pallucci. She made appearances on the game show Match Game. In 1977, she was a guest star on The Muppet Show. She also appeared on the television series Alice, in which she played a kleptomaniac and phony medium as well as Daddy Dearest, where she guest-starred opposite Richard Lewis and Don Rickles.

Ballard starred on Broadway as Helen in The Golden Apple (1954) introducing the song "Lazy Afternoon". She portrayed   Ruth in Joseph Papp's The Pirates of Penzance, Rosalie in Carnival! and the title role in Molly, an unsuccessful musical adaptation of the popular radio serial The Goldbergs. She created the role of the Countess and closed out-of-town in Marc Blitzstein's Reuben, Reuben, and played Ruth Sherwood in Wonderful Town at New York City Center in 1963.

In Long Beach, California, she played Mama Morton in Chicago and fought with a vacuum cleaner as Pauline in No, No, Nanette. In 1998, she played Hattie Walker in the Paper Mill Playhouse's acclaimed revival of Stephen Sondheim's Follies. In 2005, she appeared in a road-company production of Nunsense, written by Dan Goggin. The following year, she completed her autobiography How I Lost 10 Pounds in 53 Years.

In 1995, she was awarded a Golden Palm Star on the Palm Springs Walk of Stars.

She appeared in The Super Mario Bros. Super Show! as Madam A-Go-Go, a mysterious fortune teller who appears in the episode "Fortune Teller". She also performed with The Fabulous Palm Springs Follies at the Plaza Theatre in Palm Springs, California.

In December 2010, she, Donna McKechnie and Liliane Montevecchi starred in a production of From Broadway with Love, staged at the Lensic Theater in Santa Fe, New Mexico. Ballard was in the 2012 cabaret show Doin' It for Love, which premiered in Austin, Texas at the Paramount Theatre. Starring Ballard and Montevecchi, the cast included Broadway dancer Lee Roy Reams. (The Austin performance benefited the Texas Humane Legislation Network.) The show then went on to play in Los Angeles on March 8 and 10, 2012. Ballard announced her official retirement in 2015 at the age of 89.

Death
Ballard died at her home in Rancho Mirage, California, on January 21, 2019, at the age of 93. The cause was kidney cancer, according to a friend.

Filmography

Film

Television 
{| class="wikitable sortable"
|-
! Year
! Title
! Role
! class="unsortable" | Notes
|-
|1951–1955
|The Arthur Murray Party
|Herself
|2 episodes
|-
|1954
|The Steve Allen Show
|Herself
|1 episode
|-
|1954-1955
|The Colgate Comedy Hour
|Herself
|7 episodes
|-
|1956–1963
|The Ed Sullivan Show
|Herself
|4 episodes
|-
|1957
|Cinderella
|Portia
|TV special
|-
|1957–1962
|Tonight Starring Jack Paar
|Herself
|27 episodes
|-
|1958
|Make Me Laugh
|Herself
|3 episodes
|-
|1958–1960
|The Garry Moore Show
|Herself
|3 episodes
|-
|1960–1963
|The Perry Como Show
|Herself
|52 episodes
|-
|1962
|Play Your Hunch
|Herself
|2 episodes
|-
|1962
|The Tonight Show
|Herself
|2 episodes
|-
|1963
|Candid Camera
|Herself
|2 episodes
|-
|1963–1975
|The Tonight Show Starring Johnny Carson
|Herself
|55 episodes
|-
|1963–1978
|The Merv Griffin Show
|Herself
|10 episodes
|-
|1963–1979
|The Mike Douglas Show
|Herself
|34 episodes
|-
|1964
|
|Mrs. Selby
|"The Perfect Teenager"
|-
|1967–1968
|The Hollywood Palace
|Herself
|2 episodes
|-
|1967–1969
|
|Kaye Buell
|Main role: 56 episodes
|-
|1967–1975
|Hollywood Squares
|Herself
|168 episodes
|-
|1968
|Rowan & Martin's Laugh-In
|Guest
|"1.5"
|-
|1968-1969
|Kraft Music Hall
|Herself
|2 episodes
|-
|1968–1969
|The Jerry Lewis Show
|Herself
|4 episodes
|-
|1969
|The Red Skelton Show
|DMV Clerk
|"Willie Lump Lump's Birthday"
|-
|1969
|Storybook Squares
|Herself
|1 episode
|-
|1969
|Della
|Herself
|2 episodes
|-
|1969
|The Leslie Uggams Show
|Herself
|2 episodes
|-
|1969–1970
|Kraft Music Hall
|Herself
|3 episodes
|-
|1970
|All My Children
|Mrs. Remo
|TV series
|-
|1970
|Love, American Style
|Sally
|"Love and the V.I.P. Restaurant"
|-
|1970
|The Bob Hope Specials
|Herself
|1 episode
|-
|1970-1971
|It's Your Bet
|Herself
|2 episodes
|-
|1970–1972
|
|Angie Pallucci
|Recurring role: 10 episodes
|-
|1971
|The Dick Cavett Show 
|Herself
|1 episode
|-
|1971
|Here's Lucy
|Donna
|"Lucy and Harry's Italian Bombshell"
|-
|1971
|Love, American Style
|Helen
|"Love and the Dream Burglar"
|-
|1972
|The David Frost Show
|Herself
|1 episode
|-
|1972–1973
|The Carol Burnett Show
|Herself
|2 episodes
|-
|1973–1974
|Match Game
|Herself
|10 episodes
|-
|1973
|Pyramid
|Herself
|5 episodes
|-
|1974
|Celebrity Sweepstakes
|Herself
|1 episode
|-
|1974
|Celebrity Bowling
|Herself
|1 episode
|-
|1974
|The Bob Braun Show
|Herself
|1 episode
|-
|1974-1976
|Dinah!
|Herself
|1 episode
|-
|1975
|
|Filomena
|"Filomena's Visit"
|-
|1976
|Police Story
|Nurse Ladue
|"Officer Dooly"
|-
|1977
|Alice
|Seama
|"The Hex"
|-
|1977
|The Muppet Show
|Guest
|1 episode
|-
|1978–1981
|The Love Boat
|Cora Bass / Joan Redmond / Babe
|3 episodes
|-
|1979
|Fantasy Island
|Elvira Wilson
|'Hit Man/The Swimmer"
|-
|1980
|
|Esther Kessler
|TV miniseries
|-
|1980
|Broadway on Showtime
|Salome
|"The Robber Bridegroom"
|-
|1980
|The Steve Allen Comedy Hour
|Herself
|3 episodes
|-
|1980–1981
|Trapper John, M.D.
|Beulah Krakowsky / Mother
|2 episodes
|-
|1981
|Irene
|Dotty Busmill
|TV film
|-
|1981
|Here's Boomer
|Sophia
|"Make 'Em Laugh"
|-
|1983
|Great Performances
|Duchess
|"Alice in Wonderland"
|-
|1984
|Young People's Specials
|Mrs. Deluca
|"That Funny Fat Kid"
|-
|1985
|Doris Day's Best Friends'
|Herself
|1 episode
|-
|1986
|The Lee Phillip Show|Herself
|1 episode
|-
|1987
||Angela Calucci
|"Angela's Secret"
|-
|1989
||Madame Agogo
|1 episode
|-
|1989
|Monsters|Faye Ingram
|"Rerun"
|-
|1989–1991
||Mother Earth / Mother Nature
|2 episodes
|-
|1990–91
|What a Dummy|Mrs. Treva Travalony
|Main role: 24 episodes
|-
|1991
||Mother Earth
|"A-Camping We Will Go"
|-
|1991
|Doris Day: A Sentimental Journey|Herself
|TV documentary
|-
|1993
|Daddy Dearest|Mrs. Lento
|"Al vs. DMV"
|-
|1994–95
|Due South|Mrs. Vecchio
|3 episodes
|-
|1996–1999
|The Rosie O'Donnell Show|Herself
|3 episodes
|-
|1998–2001
|Biography|Herself
|2 episodes
|-
|1999–2001
|Mysteries and Scandals|Herself
|4 episodes
|-
|2002
|The Hollywood Greats|Herself
|Season 8, Episode 8: "Doris Day"
|-
|}

Stage workThree to Make Ready (1946)Touch and Go (London, 1950)Top Banana (1952) (replacement for Rose Marie)The Golden Apple (1954) Reuben, Reuben (1955) (closed on the road)Wonderful Town (1958; 1963) Carnival! (1961) Gypsy (Dallas, 1962) The Beast in Me (1963) Royal Flush (1964) (closed on the road)The Decline and Fall of the Entire World as Seen Through the Eyes of Cole Porter (1965, Off-Broadway)Minnie's Boys (1972) Molly (1973) Gypsy (1973) Sheba (1974) (closed on the road)Apartment 8 Strikes Back (1980)The Pirates of Penzance (1981) (replacement for Estelle Parsons)Pippin (1982) Hey, Ma ... Kaye Ballard (1984) High Spirits (1984) She stoops to conquer (1984, Off-Broadway)The Ladies Who Wrote the Lyrics (1985) Kaye Ballard: Working 42nd St. at Last! (1988, Off-Broadway)Nymph Errant (1989) Funny Girl (1991; 1997; 2002)Hey, Ma - Working Hollywood Blvd. at Last! (1991) Chicago (1992, Long Beach) No, No, Nanette (1994, Long Beach; 1997, Paper Mill Playhouse)Over the River and Through the Woods (1998, Off-Broadway) Follies (1998, Paper Mill Playhouse) The Full Monty (2001) Funny Girl (2002, New York in concert)Quartet (2002, 2006)Nunsense (2003)

Discography

References

External links
 
 
  (archived)
 
 
 
 Tinseltown Talks: Kaye Ballard at The News Herald''
 

1925 births
2019 deaths
Actresses from Cleveland
American film actresses
American musical theatre actresses
American stage actresses
American television actresses
Deaths from kidney cancer
Deaths from cancer in California
Singers from Ohio
American people of Italian descent
People of Calabrian descent
21st-century American women
American women comedians
Comedians from Ohio